Bad Dog! is an Animal Planet series that showcases viral caught on video moments of dogs behaving terribly and doing things they're not supposed to be doing. Bad Dog! started as a pilot episode on August 28, 2010 then it became a full series a year later in September 2011.

History
Bad Dog! started as a television pilot episode on August 28, 2010. The show became a series in 2011 and aired on the Animal Planet channel. The press release called the show a, "...hilarious hour of television documenting just how far pets can push their owners and still get unconditional love." The show debuted in 2011 and the first episode was titled, Bad to the Bone. There were three seasons of Bad Dog! which were spread over a five year period 2011-2016.

Reception
In 2011 Ann Tatko-Peterson of The Mercury News said, "As guilty pleasures go, this one is a winner." Writing for The New York Times Neil Genzlinger stated, "The show presents assorted dogs that are expanding the boundaries of bad canine behavior, then does nothing to correct the beasts. Instead, it seems to revel in their wickedness."

See also
List of Animal Planet original programming

References

External links
 
 Video - World's Sleepiest Dog - Bad Dog!

Animal Planet original programming
2010 American television series debuts
2010s American reality television series
Television shows about dogs